Early County is a county located on the southwest border of the U.S. state of Georgia. As of the 2020 census, the population was 10,854. The county seat is Blakely, where the Early County Courthouse is located. Created on December 15, 1818, it was named for Peter Early, 28th Governor of Georgia. The county is bordered on the west by the Chattahoochee River, forming the border with Alabama.

History
Prehistoric and nineteenth-century history has been preserved in some of Early County's attractions. It is the site of the Kolomoki Mounds, a park preserving major earthworks built by indigenous peoples of the Woodland culture more than 1700 years ago, from 350 CE to 600 CE. This is one of the largest mound complexes in the United States and the largest in Georgia; it includes burial and ceremonial mounds. The siting of the mounds expresses the ancient people's cosmology, as mounds are aligned with the sun at the spring equinox and summer solstice.

The county area was long territory of the historic Creek Indian peoples of the Southeast, particularly along the Chattahoochee River. Beginning in the early nineteenth century, European-American settlers began to encroach on this territory, pushing the Muscogee out during Indian Removal in the 1830s. The Muscogee were forced to Indian Territory west of the Mississippi River.

This area was developed by European-American settlers and their African-American enslaved workers for cotton plantations. Agriculture was critical to the economy into the 20th century. The Cohelee Creek Bridge in the county is the southernmost covered bridge still standing. One of the last wooden flagpoles from the American Civil War era is located at the historic courthouse in downtown Blakely.

According to the Equal Justice Initiative, in the period from 1877 to 1950, Early County had 24 documented lynchings of African Americans, the second-highest total in the state after the more densely populated Fulton County. Most were committed around the turn of the 20th century, in the period of Jim Crow conditions and suppression of black voting. This was still a largely agricultural area, and some disputes arose from confrontations between black sharecroppers or tenant farmers and white landowners, particularly at times to settle accounts. Another, Sidney Grist, was lynched on December 31, 1896, for "political activity".

Among these cases were five African-American men lynched by whites in less than a month in the summer of 1899: three on July 23, one on July 25 (all reportedly for rape and robbery), and one on August 3 for attempted rape. Black men were frequently identified as suspects in such cases and lynched before any trial took place; further investigations have sometimes revealed consensual sex or other persons having committed the crime. A mass lynching took place in the county on December 30, 1915, when seven black men were lynched, allegedly as suspects in a murder.

Geography

The northeastern and eastern portions of Early County, east of Blakely, and extending south to a line east of Jakin, are located in the Spring Creek sub-basin of the ACF River Basin (Apalachicola-Chattahoochee-Flint River Basin). The western portion of the county is located in the Lower Chattahoochee River sub-basin of the same ACF River Basin.

Major highways

  U.S. Route 27
  U.S. Route 27 Business
  U.S. Route 84
  State Route 1
  State Route 1 Business
  State Route 39
  State Route 45
  State Route 62
  State Route 62 Bypass
  State Route 200
  State Route 216
  State Route 273
  State Route 273 Spur
  State Route 370

Adjacent counties
 Clay County (north)
 Calhoun County (northeast)
 Baker County (east)
 Miller County (southeast)
 Seminole County (south or east)
 Houston County, Alabama (southwest/CST Border)
 Henry County, Alabama (west/CST Border)

Demographics

2000 census
As of the census of 2000, there were 12,354 people, 4,695 households, and 3,295 families living in the county. The population density was 24 people per square mile (9/km2). There were 5,338 housing units at an average density of 10 per square mile (4/km2). The racial makeup of the county was 50.3% White, 48.1% Black or African American, 0.2% Native American, 0.2% Asian, 0.1% Pacific Islander, 0.4% from other races, and 0.8% from two or more races. 1.2% of the population were Hispanic or Latino of any race.

There were 4,695 households, out of which 32.00% had children under the age of 18 living with them, 45.00% were married couples living together, 20.80% had a female householder with no husband present, and 29.80% were non-families. 26.90% of all households were made up of individuals, and 12.70% had someone living alone who was 65 years of age or older. The average household size was 2.58 and the average family size was 3.13.

In the county, the population was spread out, with 28.70% under the age of 18, 7.80% from 18 to 24, 25.90% from 25 to 44, 21.90% from 45 to 64, and 15.70% who were 65 years of age or older. The median age was 36 years. For every 100 females there were 87.10 males. For every 100 females age 18 and over, there were 80.60 males.

The median income for a household in the county was $25,629, and the median income for a family was $31,215. Males had a median income of $36,458 versus $27,277 for females. The mean income for the county was $147,364. The per capita income for the county was $14,936. About 22.20% of families and 25.70% of the population were below the poverty line, including 37.20% of those under age 18 and 20.10% of those age 65 or over.

2010 census
As of the 2010 United States Census, there were 11,008 people, 4,228 households, and 2,924 families living in the county. The racial makeup of the county was 49.6% black or African American, 48.4% white, 0.4% American Indian, 0.3% Asian, 0.5% from other races, and 0.8% from two or more races. Those of Hispanic or Latino origin made up 1.6% of the population. In terms of ancestry, 8.2% were American, 6.1% were Irish, and 5.5% were German.

Of the 4,228 households, 34.9% had children under the age of 18 living with them, 42.5% were married couples living together, 21.3% had a female householder with no husband present, 30.8% were non-families, and 27.3% of all households were made up of individuals. The average household size was 2.56 and the average family size was 3.12. The median age was 39.3 years.

The median income for a household in the county was $26,928 and the median income for a family was $40,238. Males had a median income of $36,250 versus $28,401 for females. The per capita income for the county was $16,330. About 22.9% of families and 28.9% of the population were below the poverty line, including 46.4% of those under age 18 and 15.2% of those age 65 or over.

2020 census

As of the 2020 United States census, there were 10,854 people, 4,074 households, and 2,659 families residing in the county.

Education
The Early County School District holds grades pre-school to grade twelve, and consists of one elementary school, a middle school, and a high school. The district has 156 full-time teachers and over 2,764 students.
 Early County Elementary School
 Early County Middle School
 Early County High School

Communities

Cities
 Arlington (shared with Calhoun County)
 Blakely
 Damascus
 Jakin

Unincorporated communities

 Cedar Springs
 Colomokee
 Cuba
 Freeman
 Hentown
 Hilton
 Jones Crossroads
 Killarney
 Lucile
 New Hope
 Nicholasville
 Rock Hill
 Rowena
 Saffold
 Urquhart

Politics

See also

 National Register of Historic Places listings in Early County, Georgia
List of counties in Georgia

References

External links
 Early County Official Website - The official website of Early County
 Early County 2055 - a non-profit corporation established by native son Charles Barton Rice and Catherine B. Rice to support the revitalization, economic development and preservation of Blakely and Early County, Georgia.
 Blakely - Early County Chamber of Commerce  - Chamber of Commerce for Blakely and surrounding communities of Jakin, Arlington and Damascus.
 Southwest Georgia Academy(SGA)-a private school is located in Damascus and its adjoining Counties by Georgia Independent School Association (GISA)
 Early County News, a local newspaper founded by the Fleming Family in 1859
 Early County historical marker

Further reading
 Jerald T. Milanich, The Archaeology of Precolumbian Florida (Gainesville: University Press of Florida, 1994).
 Jerald T. Milanich, et al., McKeithen Weeden Island: The Culture of Northern Florida, A.D. 200-900  (New York: Academic Press, 1984).
 Thomas J. Pluckhahn, Kolomoki: Settlement, Ceremony, and Status in the Deep South, A.D. 350 to 750 (Tuscaloosa: University of Alabama Press, 2003).
 William H. Sears, Excavations at Kolomoki: Final Report (Athens: University of Georgia Press, 1956).
 Christopher Trowell, "A Kolomoki Chronicle: The History of a Plantation, a State Park, and the Archaeological Search for Kolomoki's Prehistory," Early Georgia 26, no. 1 (1998).
 Mark Williams and Daniel T. Elliott, eds., A World Engraved: Archaeology of the Swift Creek Culture (Tuscaloosa: University of Alabama Press, 1998).

 
1818 establishments in Georgia (U.S. state)
Populated places established in 1818
Georgia (U.S. state) counties
Black Belt (U.S. region)
Majority-minority counties in Georgia